"Gente di mare" ("People of the sea") was the  entry in the Eurovision Song Contest 1987, performed in Italian by Umberto Tozzi & Raf.

The song is a blues-influenced ballad, in which the singers describe the qualities of the "people of the sea". They describe themselves as "people of the plain", who are "prisoners of this city", while contrasting that with the freedom of the people of the sea "who leave [things] behind".

The song was performed seventh on the night, following 's Lotta Engberg with "Boogaloo" and preceding 's Nevada with "Neste barco à vela". At the close of voting, it had received 103 points, placing 3rd in a field of 22.

While not winning the contest, the song achieved considerable popularity, becoming a Top 10 hit in most parts of Continental Europe and Scandinavia in the summer of 1987 (#7 in Switzerland, #8 in Austria, #6 in Sweden) and was included on the compilations of Winners and Classics produced to coincide with the Congratulations special in late 2005.

It was succeeded as Italian representative at the 1988 contest by Luca Barbarossa with "Vivo (Ti scrivo)".

Dutch-language covers
Dutch satirists Henk Spaan and Harry Vermeegen performed the song in 1988 on their successful TV show Verona as "Ach, laat maar waaien".
A Dutch reworked version, called "Alles kwijt" was done by Marco Borsato.

Charts

References

External links
"Gente di mare" audio on YouTube

Eurovision songs of Italy
Eurovision songs of 1987
Songs written by Umberto Tozzi
Songs written by Raf (singer)
Songs written by Giancarlo Bigazzi
1987 songs